Babak is a common Persian given name for males. It derives from the Middle Persian name Pāpak which means "beloved father".

People with this name
 Babak (c. 222), Persian prince and father (or stepfather) of Ardashir I, founder of the Sasanian Empire
 Babak (Sasanian general)
 Babak Khorramdin (795 or 798–838), Khurramite leader who fought against the Abbasid Caliphate
 Babak Amir-Tahmasseb (born 1976), French-Iranian kayaker
 Babak Hassibi, Iranian-American electrical engineer
 Babak Jahanbakhsh (born 1983), Iranian pop singer
 Babak Payami (born 1966), Iranian film director
 Babak Rafati (born 1970), Iranian-German football referee
 Babak Dehghanpisheh, American journalist
 Bobak Ferdowsi (born 1979), American engineer at NASA's Jet Propulsion Laboratory

See also
 Babak (disambiguation)

Notes

References

Persian masculine given names